The 1986 WCT Tournament of Champions, also known by its sponsored name Shearson Lehman Brothers Tournament of Champions,  was a men's tennis tournament played on outdoor clay courts in Forest Hills, Queens, New York City in the United States. The event was part of the 1986 Grand Prix circuit and was organized by World Championship Tennis (WCT). It was the tenth edition of the tournament and was held from May 5 through May 11, 1986. Fourth-seeded Yannick Noah won the singles title.

Finals

Singles
 Yannick Noah defeated  Guillermo Vilas 7–6(7–3), 6–0
 It was Noah's 1st singles title of the year and the 18th of his career.

Doubles
 Hans Gildemeister /  Andrés Gómez defeated  Boris Becker /  Slobodan Živojinović 7–6, 7–5

References

External links
 International Tennis Federation – tournament edition details

1986 Grand Prix (tennis)
World Championship Tennis Tournament of Champions
WCT Tournament of Champions
WCT Tournament of Champions